Będzin Power Station is a cogeneration plant in Będzin, Silesian Voivodeship, Poland.

The plant is operated by the Elektrociepłownia Będzin S.A. company. It is the major energy provider for the Zagłębie Dąbrowskie. Its construction begun in 1913, and it started operating in 1916. The company is a stock action company since 1993, and is listed on the Warsaw Stock Exchange.

Electrical production in 2014 was 151,140 MW·h.

Rated capacity of the two OP-140 utility boilers is 2 x 145 t/h = 290 t/h, equivalent to 112,6 MWt each, 225,2 MWt total.

Rated heat capacity of the heating boilers (1 x WP-70 and 1 x WP-120) is 220.2 MWt. The total installed heat capacity is 445.4 MWt plus 83.5 MWt in cogeneration from the 13UCK 80 turboset. (UCK is a turbine classification acronym which stands for "kondensacyjne z upustami przemysłowymi i ciepłowniczymi", polish for "condensation with industrial and district heating")

See also

Łagisza Power Station

References

External links
 Official homepage

Companies listed on the Warsaw Stock Exchange
Energy infrastructure completed in 1916
Cogeneration power stations in Poland
Będzin
Buildings and structures in Silesian Voivodeship